Kanalsi is a village situated near Yamuna river in Yamunanagar district of Haryana state in India. It is about 16.5 km from Yamunanagar city, 82 km from Ambala and 112 km from Chandigarh.

References 

Villages in Yamunanagar district